The 2011–12 season was the 88th season in the existence of AEK Athens F.C. and the 53rd consecutive season in the top flight of Greek football. They competed in the Super League, the Greek Cup and the UEFA Europa League. The season began on 18 August 2011 and finished on 20 May 2012.

Events

 15 June: Goalkeeper Moschonas signs new 2-year deal.
 16 June: Forward Liberopoulos signs new 1-year deal.
 7 July: AEK Athens and Puma sign new 3-year deal.
 12 July: Defender Dellas signs new 1-year deal.
 20 July: Youth coach Kola is released from the club.

Players

Squad information

NOTE: The players are the ones that have been announced by the AEK Athens' press release. No edits should be made unless a player arrival or exit is announced. Updated 30 June 2012, 23:59 UTC+3.

Transfers

In

Summer

Winter

Out

Summer

Winter

Notes

 a.  Sevilla paid €110K AEK for the loan termination.

Loan in

Summer

Loan out

Summer

Winter

Renewals

Overall transfer activity

Expenditure
Summer:  €275,000

Winter:  €0

Total:  €275,000

Income
Summer:  €2,800,000

Winter:  €0

Total:  €2,800,000

Net Totals
Summer:  €2,525,000

Winter:  €0

Total:  €2,525,000

Club

Management

Kit

|

|

|

Other information

Pre-season and friendlies

Super League Greece

Regular season

League table

Results summary

Results by Matchday

Fixtures

Play-offs

Results by Matchday

Fixtures

Greek Cup

Matches

UEFA Europa League

Play-off round

Group stage

Statistics

Squad statistics

! colspan="15" style="background:#FFDE00; text-align:center" | Goalkeepers
|-

! colspan="15" style="background:#FFDE00; color:black; text-align:center;"| Defenders
|-

! colspan="15" style="background:#FFDE00; color:black; text-align:center;"| Midfielders
|-

! colspan="15" style="background:#FFDE00; color:black; text-align:center;"| Forwards
|-

! colspan="15" style="background:#FFDE00; color:black; text-align:center;"| Left during Winter Transfer Window
|-

|-
|}

Disciplinary record

|-
! colspan="20" style="background:#FFDE00; text-align:center" | Goalkeepers

|-
! colspan="20" style="background:#FFDE00; color:black; text-align:center;"| Defenders

|-
! colspan="20" style="background:#FFDE00; color:black; text-align:center;"| Midfielders

|-
! colspan="20" style="background:#FFDE00; color:black; text-align:center;"| Forwards

|-
! colspan="20" style="background:#FFDE00; color:black; text-align:center;"| Left during Winter Transfer window

|-
|}

Starting 11

Overall
{| class="wikitable" style="text-align: center"
|-
!
!Total
! Home
! Away
|-
| colspan=4| Team
|-
| align=left| Games played || 21 || 11 || 10
|-
| align=left| Games won || 11 || 7 || 4
|-
| align=left| Games drawn || 2 || 1 || 1
|-
| align=left| Games lost || 8 || 3 || 5
|-
| align=left| Biggest win || 3–0 (vs Aris) || 3–0 (vs Aris) || 2–0 (vs Panetolikos)3 – 1 (vs Sturm Graz)
|-
| align=left| Biggest loss || 1–4 (vs Anderlecht)0 – 3 (vs PAOK) || 1–3 (vs Lokomotiv Moscow) || 1–4 (vs Anderlecht)0 – 3 (vs PAOK)
|-
| align=left| Biggest win (League) || 3–0 (vs Aris) || 3–0 (vs Aris) || 2–0 (vs Panetolikos)
|-
| align=left| Biggest win (Cup) || — || — || —
|-
| align=left| Biggest win (Europe) || 3–1 (vs Sturm Graz) || 1–0 (vs Dinamo Tbilisi) || 3–1 (vs Sturm Graz)
|-
| align=left| Biggest loss (League) || 0–3 (vs PAOK) || – || 0–3 (vs PAOK)
|-
| align=left| Biggest loss (Cup) || — || — || —
|-
| align=left| Biggest loss (Europe) || 1–4 (vs Anderlecht) || 1–3 (vs Lokomotiv Moscow) || 1–4 (vs Anderlecht)
|-
| align=left| Clean sheets || 7 || 5 || 2
|-
| align=left| Goals scored || 32 || 16 || 16
|-
| align=left| Goals conceded || 31 || 10 || 21
|-
| align=left| Goal difference || +1 || +6 || −5
|-
|-
|-
| align=left| Assists || 19 || 10 || 9
|-
| align=left| Yellow cards  || 73 || 36 || 37
|-
| align=left| Sent offs  || 4 || 3 || 1
|-
| align=left| Red cards  || 1 || 0 || 1
|-
| align=left| Points || 35/63 (55.56%) || 22/33 (66.66%) || 13/30 (43.33%)
|-
| align=left| Winning rate || 52.38% || 63.64% || 40.00%
|-
| colspan=4| Players
|-
| align=left| Most appearances || Leonardo (40) || Leonardo (10)Beleck (10) || Manolas (10)
|-
| align=left| Top scorer || Leonardo (13) || Leonardo (5) || Beleck (4)
|-
| align=left| Top assister || Roger (4) || Beleck (2)José Carlos (2) || Roger (4)
|-
| align=left| Yellow cards  || Makos (14)Manolas (14) || Makos (5) || Karabelas (5)Vargas (5)
|-
| align=left| Sent offs  || Manolas (2) || Dellas (1)Makos (1)Rikka (1) || Manolas (1)
|-
| align=left| Red cards  || Makos (1) || – || Makos (1)
|-

References

External links
AEK Athens F.C. Official Website

2011-12
Greek football clubs 2011–12 season
AEK Athens